Aulis Pystynen (3 January 1928 – 6 January 1996) was a Finnish middle-distance runner. He competed in the men's 1500 metres at the 1952 Summer Olympics.

References

1928 births
1996 deaths
Athletes (track and field) at the 1952 Summer Olympics
Finnish male middle-distance runners
Olympic athletes of Finland
Sportspeople from Espoo